Cafe Moscow (Hungarian:Café Moszkva) is a 1936 Hungarian adventure film directed by Steve Sekely and starring Anna Tõkés, Gyula Csortos and Ferenc Kiss. Art direction was by József Pán. It is also known by the alternative title Only One Night. The film is set during the First World War on the Eastern Front between Russia and the Austro-Hungarian Empire. The film was intended to convey an anti-war message.

Plot summary

Cast
 Anna Tõkés as Verjusa, Szuharov felesége  
 Gyula Csortos as Szuharov tábornok 
 Ferenc Kiss as Baklusin szárnysegéd 
 Lajos Vértes as Szilágyi fõhadnagy  
 József Timár as Bernát Gazsi hadnagy  
 József Juhász as Kadosa Géza zászlós 
 Nusi Somogyi as A Café Moszkva pénztárosnõje  
 Gerő Mály as Orosz hadifogoly 
 Lajos Gárdonyi as Izsák,a csempész
 Béla Bálint as Magyar ezredes  
 Manyi Kiss 
 Ilona Erdös
 István Berend 
 István Bársony 
 Gyula Szőreghy 
 Gyula Justh   
 Andor Sárossy 
 László Keleti

References

Bibliography 
 Cunningham, John. Hungarian Cinema: From Coffee House to Multiplex. Wallflower, 2004.
 Nemeskürty, István & Szántó, Tibor. A Pictorial Guide to the Hungarian Cinema, 1901-1984. Helikon, 1985.

External links 
 
 

1936 films
1936 adventure films
1930s Hungarian-language films
Films directed by Steve Sekely
Films set in the 1910s
World War I films
Hungarian black-and-white films